Glen Abernethy (born 1971) is a territorial level politician from Northwest Territories, Canada.

Abernethy ran as a candidate in the Great Slave electoral district in the 2007 Northwest Territories general election. He defeated four other candidates winning the district with 43% of the popular vote to earn his first term in office. He represented the district until the 2019 Northwest Territories general election, when he retired from politics and did not stand for reelection.

References

Members of the Legislative Assembly of the Northwest Territories
Living people
People from Yellowknife
1971 births
Members of the Executive Council of the Northwest Territories
21st-century Canadian politicians